Isomata may refer to:

Idyllwild School of Music and the Arts
Isomata, Samos, a village in the municipal unit Marathokampos, Greece
Isomata, Evrytania, a village in the municipality Karpenisi, Greece

See also

Isoma (disambiguation)